The Highland Lodge, also known as Pequea, is a historic home and resort building complex located at Frederick, Frederick County, Maryland, United States. It consists of a large Victorian period frame house centered at the end of a circular driveway, and its complement of outbuildings. The house is large and rambling and considered eclectic in style with a prominent central projecting gable. The property includes a frame stable and carriage house, now garages; a small frame barn; a small log dwelling moved to the property in the early 20th century; a frame summer kitchen and a frame secondary dwelling. It was developed originally in 1881 as a summer home for John H. Williams, a wealthy and influential Frederick attorney and banker.

The Highland Lodge was listed on the National Register of Historic Places in 1998.

References

External links
, including photo from 2004, at Maryland Historical Trust

Houses on the National Register of Historic Places in Maryland
Gothic Revival architecture in Maryland
Colonial Revival architecture in Maryland
Houses completed in 1881
Houses in Frederick County, Maryland
National Register of Historic Places in Frederick County, Maryland
1881 establishments in Maryland